or , sometimes simply shortened as  is traditional Siamese theatrical, musical, and acrobatic dance performance originated from the southern regions of Thailand. Over five hundred years old,  is performed in Thailand's local community centres and at temple fairs and cultural events, and is passed on through training by masters in homes, community organizations and educational institutions.

In 2021,  is officially recognized by the UNESCO (United Nations Educational, Scientific and Cultural Organization) as the Representative List of the Intangible Cultural Heritage of Humanity originated from southern Thailand.

References

Further reading

 
 
 
 
 
 
 
 
 

Malay Peninsula
Peninsular Malaysia
Thai dance
Thai culture
Southern Thailand
Masterpieces of the Oral and Intangible Heritage of Humanity